The Yuliangze Formation, or Yuliangzi Formation, is a geological formation in Heilongjiang, China whose strata date back to the early-middle Maastrichtian. Dinosaur remains are among the fossils that have been recovered from the formation.

Vertebrate paleofauna
 Charonosaurus jiayinensis - "Partial skull and partial, fragmentary postcranial elements."
 Mandschurosaurus amurensis (Hadrosaurinae indet.)
 Sahaliyania elunchunorum (Hadrosauridae indet.)
 Tarbosaurus bataar
Saurolophus krystofovici
 Wulagasaurus dongi

See also

 List of dinosaur-bearing rock formations

References

Upper Cretaceous Series of Asia
Maastrichtian Stage